SGC may refer to:

Science and technology
Satellite ground station
Server-Gated Cryptography
Soluble guanylate cyclase (sGC)
Standard Geographical Classification code (Canada)
Structural Genomics Consortium
Salivary gland carcinoma, a type of oral cancer
Swan-Ganz catheter, a type of pulmonary artery catheter

People and job titles
Swiss Gaming Crew, a new E-Sports Team from League of Legends 
Stephen Grover Cleveland, the 22nd and 24th president of the United States
Secretary-General of the Council of the European Union, head of the General Secretariat of the Council

Economics and finance
Superannuation guarantee charge, an aspect of superannuation in Australia
Sakura Global Capital, Inc., an swap house (a subsidiary of The Sakura Bank, Limited)

Entertainment
Sega Genesis Collection
SGC (wine)
Sonic Gems Collection
Southern Gospel Choir
Stargate Command
ScrewAttack Gaming Convention
SGC Records (Screen Gems-Columbia) a subsidiary of Atlantic Records that distributed the Nazz